is a passenger railway station in located in the city of Tsu,  Mie Prefecture, Japan, operated by the private railway operator Kintetsu Railway.

Lines
Higashi-Aoyama Station is served by the Osaka Line, and is located 91.5 rail kilometers from the starting point of the line at Ōsaka Uehommachi Station.

Station layout
The station was consists of two opposed island platforms, connected by an underground passage. The station is unattended.

Platforms

Adjacent stations

History
Higashi-Aoyama Station opened on December 20, 1930 as a station on the Sangu Kyuko Electric Railway. After merging with Osaka Electric Kido on March 15, 1941, the line became the Kansai Kyuko Railway's Osaka Line. This line was merged with the Nankai Electric Railway on June 1, 1944 to form Kintetsu. On October 25, 1971, due to failure of an ATS system in Aoyama Tunnel, a runaway limited express train derailed in Sodani Tunnel near this station and collided head on with another one, with 25 fatalities (article in Japanese). On November 25, 1975, after a landslide obliterated part of the tracks between this station and Sakakibara-Onsenguchi Station, the tracks were rerouted slightly, a new tunnel was constructed, and a new station building was built. On February 27, 2009 a derailment of a local train occurred at this station, but without fatalities.

Passenger statistics
In fiscal 2019, the station was used by an average of 36 passengers daily (boarding passengers only).

Surrounding area
Aoyama Highlands
 Nunobiki Waterfall

See also
List of railway stations in Japan

References

External links

 Kintetsu: Higashi-Aoyama Station

Railway stations in Japan opened in 1930
Railway stations in Mie Prefecture
Stations of Kintetsu Railway
Tsu, Mie